The 2019 UT Martin Skyhawks football team represented the University of Tennessee at Martin as a member of the Ohio Valley Conference (OVC) during the 2019 NCAA Division I FCS football season. Led by 14th-year head coach Jason Simpson, the Skyhawks compiled an overall record of 7–5 with a mark of 6–2 in conference play, placing third in the OVC. UT Martin played home games at Graham Stadium in Martin, Tennessee.

Previous season
The Skyhawks finished the 2018 season 2–9, 2–6 in OVC play to finish in eighth place.

Preseason

Preseason coaches' poll
The OVC released their preseason coaches' poll on July 22, 2019. The Skyhawks were picked to finish in sixth place.

Preseason All-OVC team
The Skyhawks had three players at two positions selected to the preseason all-OVC team.

Offense

Terry Fultz – OT

Defense

Julian Crutchfield – DL

Austin Pickett – DL

Schedule

Game summaries

Northwestern State

at Florida

at Southern Illinois

Murray State

at Eastern Kentucky

at Tennessee Tech

Eastern Illinois

at Southeast Missouri State

Jacksonville State

at Austin Peay

Tennessee State

at Kentucky

References

UT Martin
UT Martin Skyhawks football seasons
UT Martin Skyhawks football